Mannosylglycoprotein endo-beta-mannosidase (endo-beta-mannosidase) is an enzyme. This enzyme catalyses the following chemical reaction:

 Hydrolysis of the alpha-D-mannosyl-(1->6)-beta-D-mannosyl-(1->4)-N-acetyl-beta-D-glucosaminyl-(1->4)-N-acetyl-beta-D-glucosaminyl sequence of glycoprotein to alpha-D-mannosyl-(1->6)-D-mannose and N-acetyl-beta-D-glucosaminyl-(1->4)-N-acetyl-beta-D-glucosaminyl sequences

The substrate group is a substituent on N-4 of an asparagine residue in the glycoprotein.

References

External links 
 

EC 3.2.1